Meghnad Saha  (6 October 1893 – 16 February 1956) was an Indian astrophysicist who developed the Saha ionization equation, used to describe chemical and physical conditions in stars. His work allowed astronomers to accurately relate the spectral classes of stars to their actual temperatures. He was elected to the Parliament of India in 1952 from Calcutta.

Biography

Meghnad Saha was born in 1893 in a very poor  family in Shaoratoli, a village at  Dhaka, Bikrampur, in the former Bengal Presidency of British India (in present-day Village- Shaoratoli, Thana- Kaliakair, District- Gazipur, Bangladesh). Son of Jagannath Saha (a grocer) and Smt. Bhubneshwari Devi, Meghnad struggled to rise in life. During his early schooling he was forced to leave Dhaka Collegiate School because he participated in the Swadeshi movement. He earned his Indian School Certificate from Dhaka College. He was also a student at the Presidency College, Kolkata and Rajabazar Science College CU. As a student, Saha faced caste-based discrimination from his fellow students. When Saha was at the Eden Hindu Hostel, upper-caste students objected to him eating in the same dining hall as them. He was also a professor at Allahabad University from 1923 to 1938, and thereafter a professor and Dean of the Faculty of Science at the University of Calcutta until his death in 1956. He became Fellow of the Royal Society in 1927. He was president of the 21st session of the Indian Science Congress in 1934.

Amongst Saha's classmates were Satyendra Nath Bose, Jnan Ghosh and Jnanendra Nath Mukherjee. In his later life he was close to Amiya Charan Banerjee. Saha was an atheist.

Career
Saha's study of the thermal ionisation of elements led him to formulate what is known as the Saha equation. This equation is one of the basic tools for interpretation of the spectra of stars in astrophysics. By studying the spectra of various stars, one can find their temperature and from that, using Saha's equation, determine the ionisation state of the various elements making up the star. This work was soon extended by Ralph H. Fowler and Edward Arthur Milne. Saha had previously reached the following conclusion on the subject.

Saha also invented an instrument to measure the weight and pressure of solar rays and helped to build several scientific institutions, such as the Physics Department in Allahabad University and the Institute of Nuclear Physics in Calcutta. He founded the journal Science and Culture and was the editor until his death. He was the leading spirit in organizing several scientific societies, such as the National Academy of Science (1930), the Indian Physical Society (1934), Indian Institute of Science (1935). He was the Director at Indian Association for the Cultivation of Science during 1953–1956. The Saha Institute of Nuclear Physics, founded in 1943 in Kolkata, is named after him.

To actively participate in the planning of education, industrialization, health, and river valley development, Saha stood as a candidate in the constituency of North-West Calcutta in the 1951 Loksabha election. He ran on the ticket of Union of Socialists and Progressives but Saha always maintained his independence. He was pitted against a powerful and well-funded candidate from Congress, Mr. Prabhu Dayal Himatsingka. Saha was not well funded for his campaign and wrote to his publisher in November 1951 to ask for a Rs 5,000 advance against the sale of his textbook, Treatise on Heat, "because I am standing for election in the house of the people from NW Calcutta". Saha won the contest by a margin of 16%.

Saha actively participated in the parliament in the areas of Education, Refugee and Rehabilitation, Atomic Energy, Multipurpose River Projects and Flood Control and long term planning. In the book "Meghnad Saha in Parliament"  Saha is described as "Never unduly critical, Saha was so forthright, so incisive, so thorough in pointing out lapses that the treasury bench was constantly on the defensive. This is brought out by the way he was accused of leaving his laboratory and straying into a territory not his own. But the reason why he was slowly drifting towards this public role (he was never a politician in the correct sense of the term) was the gradually widening gulf between his dream and the reality—between his vision of an industrialised India and the Government implementation of the plan."

Saha was the chief architect of river planning in India and prepared the original plan for the Damodar Valley Project. His own observation with respect to his transition into government projects and political affairs is as follows:

Death
Saha died on 16 February 1956 of a cardiac arrest in New Delhi. He was on his way to the office of the Planning Commission in Rashtrapati Bhavan, when he collapsed a few yards away from there. He died on the way to hospital, at 10:15 a.m. (IST). It was reported that he had been suffering from hypertension for ten months prior to his death. His remains were cremated at the Keoratola crematorium in Kolkata the following day.

Tributes to Saha

 "Meghnad Saha's ionization equation (c. 1920), which opened the door to stellar astrophysics was one of the top ten achievements of 20th century Indian science [and] could be considered in the Nobel Prize class." — Jayant Narlikar
 "The impetus given to astrophysics by Saha's work can scarcely be overestimated, as nearly all later progress in this field has been influenced by it and much of the subsequent work has the character of refinements of Saha’s ideas." — Svein Rosseland
 "He (Saha) was extremely simple, almost austere, in his habits and personal needs. Outwardly, he sometimes gave an impression of being remote, matter of fact, and even harsh, but once the outer shell was broken, one invariably found in him a person of extreme warmth, deep humanity, sympathy and understanding; and though almost altogether unmindful of his own personal comforts, he was extremely solicitous in the case of others. It was not in his nature to placate others. He was a man of undaunted spirit, resolute determination, untiring energy and dedication." — Daulat Singh Kothari

References

Further reading
 
 Obituary - The Observatory 76 (1956) 40
 Obituary – Proceedings of the Astronomical Society of the Pacific 68 (1956) 282
 
 Jibamitra Ganguly: Meghnad Saha : his science and persona through letters and writings. Indian National Science Academy, New Delhi 2019.
 Collected works of Meghnad Saha. ed. by Santimay Chatterjee. Calcutta [u.a.]: Institute of Nuclear Physics [u.a.], 1982.

External links

  
 Meghnad N. Saha at the Encyclopædia Britannica
 
 
 
 
  by Raja Choudhury and produced by PSBT and Indian Public Diplomacy.

1893 births
1956 deaths
India MPs 1952–1957
20th-century Indian physicists
Bengali astronomers
Bengali physicists
Dhaka College alumni
Indian Hindus
Fellows of the Indian National Science Academy
Fellows of the Royal Society
Hare School alumni
Indian astrophysicists
Lok Sabha members from West Bengal
People from Dhaka
Plasma physicists
Politicians from Kolkata
Presidency University, Kolkata alumni
Presidents of The Asiatic Society
Academic staff of the University of Allahabad
University of Calcutta alumni
Academic staff of the University of Calcutta
Bengali scientists
Dhaka Collegiate School alumni